The Hope Bay greenstone belt, also called the Hope Bay volcanic belt, is a  long Archean greenstone belt in western Nunavut, Canada. It consists of mostly mafic volcanic rocks and contains three major gold deposits called Boston, Doris and Naartok.

See also

List of volcanoes in Canada
Volcanism of Canada
Volcanism of Northern Canada
List of greenstone belts

References
Volcanic Architecture Of A Part Of The Archean Hope Bay Greenstone Belt, Nunavut, Canada

Volcanism of Nunavut
Greenstone belts
Archean volcanism